John Stevens Cabot Abbott (September 19, 1805 – June 17, 1877), an American historian, pastor, and pedagogical writer, was born in Brunswick, Maine to Jacob and Betsey Abbott.

Early life
He was a brother of Jacob Abbott, and was associated with him in the management of Abbott's Institute in New York City, and in the preparation of his series of brief historical biographies. Abbott graduated at Bowdoin College in 1825, prepared for the ministry at Andover Theological Seminary, and between 1830 and 1844, when he retired from the ministry in the Congregational Church, preached successively at Worcester, Roxbury, and Nantucket, all in Massachusetts.

Literary career
Owing to the success of his work, The Mother at Home, he devoted himself from 1844 onwards, to literature. He was a voluminous writer of books on Christian ethics, and of popular histories, which were credited with cultivating a popular interest in history. He is best known as the author of the widely popular History of Napoleon Bonaparte (1855), in which the various elements and episodes in Napoleon's career are described.  Abbott takes a very favourable view towards his subject throughout. Also among his principal works are: History of the Civil War in America (1863–1866),History of Napoleon III Emperor of the French (1868), and The History of Frederick II, Called Frederick the Great (New York, 1871). He also did a foreword to a book called Life of Boone by W.M. Bogart, about Daniel Boone in 1876.

His biography in The Biographical Dictionary of America (1906) states that Abbot's mind was extremely clear and active, and he could leave the subject in hand for something entirely different, and then resume his former work without the slightest inconvenience, also he was blessed with a singularly even temperament; by his personal goodness, as well as by his books, he had a great influence on the world, he continued active in work nearly to the time of his death, to which he looked forward with joy rather than resignation. The anonymous author of his biography in the Encyclopædia Britannica (11th ed.) stated "He was a voluminous writer of books on Christian ethics, and of histories, which now seem unscholarly and untrustworthy, but were valuable in their time in cultivating a popular interest in history"; and that in general, except that he did not write juvenile fiction, his work in subject and style closely resembles that of his brother, Jacob Abbott.

Marriage and children
On August 17, 1830 he married Jane Williams Bourne, daughter of Abner Bourne and Abagail Williams.  Together they raised nine children: 
John Brown Abbott (November 29, 1831 – May 24, 1839)
Jane Maria Abbott (born November 25, 1833)
Waldo Abbott (September 8, 1836 – July 7, 1864)
Harriet Vaughan Abbott (born February 18, 1838)
Ellen Williams Abbott(born January 11, 1840)
Laura Sallucia Abbott (born October 30, 1843)
Elizabeth Ballister Abbott (March 15, 1847 – February 23, 1864)
Emma Susan Abbott (born July 12, 1849)
Gorham Dummer Abbott (September 3, 1807 – August 3, 1874)

As a part of the 1872 Iwakura Mission Abbott was given guardianship of Shige Nagai, a Japanese girl sent to the United States to be educated. She became one of the first piano teachers in Japan, and one of the first two Japanese women to attend a college.

Abbott died at Fair Haven, Connecticut on 17 June 1877. In 1910, a series of twenty short biographies of historical characters by J. S. C. and Jacob Abbott, was published. His brother, Gorham Dummer Abbott, was a pioneer in women’s education in the United States, as well as an author. Abbott's grandson, Willis Abbott, was a journalist and author and an editor of The Christian Science Monitor.

Selected bibliography

Inspirational/religious
The Mother At Home (c. 1830)
The Path of Peace (1836)
The Child At Home (1834)
The School-Boy (1839)
The History of Christianity: consisting of the life and teachings of Jesus of Nazareth, the adventures of Paul and the apostles and the most interesting events in the progress of Christianity from the earliest period to the present time (1872)

Historical
The History of the Civil War in America, (two volumes)
The History of Napoleon Bonaparte (1855) (two volumes)
Napoleon At St. Helena (1855)
Kings And Queens (1855)
Confidential Correspondence Of The Emperor Napoleon (1856)
 The French Revolution of 1789 (1900) [1859]
The Empire Of Russia: Its Rise And Present Power
Austria: Its Rise And Present Power
History of the Habsburg Empire
Italy
The History of Napoleon III, Emperor of the French (1868)
The Romance Of Spanish History (1869)
Prussia and the Franco-Prussian War  (1871)
The History Of Frederick II, Called Frederick The Great (1871)
The History of The State of Ohio (1875)
Lives Of The Presidents Of The United States (1876)

Biographies
Published after 1850 in the series Illustrated History, with other titles by his brother Jacob Abbott. Later reissued in the Famous Characters of History series, and in the 1904 series Makers of History:
Cortez
Henry IV
Louis XIV
King Philip (Metacomet), war chief of the Wampanoag people
Madame Roland
Marie Antoinette: Makers of History (1901)
Joseph Bonaparte, elder brother of Napoleon Bonaparte
Josephine, wife of Napoleon Bonaparte
Hortense, daughter of Josephine
Louis Philippe, the last king to rule France, although Emperor Napoleon III would serve as its last monarch.
The American Pioneers And Patriots set:
Daniel Boone 
Miles Standish 
De Soto
Peter Stuyvesant
Kit Carson
David Crockett
Captain Kidd
John Paul Jones
La Salle
Christopher Columbus
George Washington
Benjamin Franklin

Juvenile
The Child At Home (1834)
The School Boy (1839)
The School Girl (1840)
A Visit To The Mountains (1844)

Notes

References

Attribution

External links

 
 
 
 
 John Stevens Cabot Abbott Autograph Book at the William L. Clements Library

1805 births
1877 deaths
American Congregationalist ministers
19th-century Congregationalist ministers
19th-century American historians
19th-century American male writers
Abbott family
Bowdoin College alumni
Writers from Brunswick, Maine
Christian ethicists
American male biographers
American biographers
19th-century biographers
Andover Theological Seminary alumni
American male non-fiction writers